William Hassett was the 3rd Deputy Supreme Knight of the Knights of Columbus. He was from Wallingford, Connecticut.  Previously he had served as Supreme Lecturer.

References

Sources 

 

Deputy Supreme Knights of the Knights of Columbus
People from Wallingford, Connecticut